Burago di Molgora is a comune (municipality) in the Province of Monza and Brianza in the Italian region Lombardy, located about  northeast of Milan.

Burago di Molgora borders the following municipalities: Vimercate, Ornago, Cavenago di Brianza, Agrate Brianza. The economy, traditionally based on agriculture, is now concentrated in middle- or small-size industries, tertiary industries, and service companies. The city is the seat of Bburago, a scale model maker, and of Pasini Laboratorio chimico, producer of Crystal Ball.

Immigration 
 Demographic Statistics

References

External links
 Official website